The Orcutt Ranch Horticulture Center, formally known as Rancho Sombra del Roble, is a Los Angeles Historic-Cultural Monument (HCM #31) located in the West Hills section of Los Angeles, California, USA.

William Orcutt's vacation home

Orcutt Ranch was the vacation and retirement estate of William Warren Orcutt, an early pioneer of oil production in California and the discoverer of one of the first prehistoric skeletons at the La Brea Tar Pits.  The Rancho Sombra del Roble, Spanish for "Ranch of the Shaded Oak", was originally a  cattle ranch and citrus orchard at the foot of the Simi Hills.  Orcutt bought the property in 1917,  and hired architect L.G. Knipe (who designed some of the original campus structures of Arizona State University) to design his home on the ranch.  The  residence, in the blend of Spanish Colonial Revival Style and Mission Revival Style architecture, was completed in approximately 1926. It features glazed tiles from Mexico and carved mahogany and walnut from the Philippines.  Visitors are surprised to find that the design of the home prominently incorporates bas-relief Swastika architectural decoration. Mary Orcutt, William's wife, chose the symbol due to its connection with Native American traditions, and did so before the Nazis turned it into a symbol of anti-Semitism and genocide.  President Herbert Hoover, who was a friend of the Orcutts, visited the ranch.

Acquisition and operation by the City

A  portion of the original estate, including the residence, gardens, oaks and citrus orchard, was designated as a Historic-Cultural Monument in January 1965. Those  were purchased by the City of Los Angeles in 1966 for $400,000. The city-owned property includes a Spanish-style adobe residence, extensive gardens, oak trees hundreds of years old, Dayton Creek, nature trails, fruit orchards, rose gardens, community garden plots, picnic tables and a multitude of exotic trees, plants and shrubs. For 53 years (1927–1980), Ernest Conrejo was employed as the property's caretaker and gardener. Cornejo was hired at age 17 to plant and tend to the exotic trees and plants.

The Los Angeles Recreation and Parks Department operates Orcutt Ranch, which is available to be rented for special events.  It is also opened up for popular public fruit picks.

See also 

 Citrus
 Orange (fruit)
 Citrus production
 California Citrus State Historic Park
 Agricultural Museum (periodical)
 Mother Orange Tree
 Washington navel orange tree (Riverside, California)
 List of Los Angeles Historic-Cultural Monuments in the San Fernando Valley
 List of Registered Historic Places in Los Angeles
 Mission Revival Style architecture
 Spanish Colonial Revival architecture

References

External links
, Los Angeles City Parks
CSUN Library Digital Archives: San Fernando Valley Citrus Fruit Industry collection - online vintage photographs.

Parks in the San Fernando Valley
Gardens in California
Parks in Los Angeles
Houses in Los Angeles
Historic house museums in California
Open-air museums in California
Citrus
Citrus
Farm museums in California
Houses completed in 1926
Los Angeles Historic-Cultural Monuments
History of the San Fernando Valley
History of Los Angeles
Buildings and structures in the San Fernando Valley
Mediterranean Revival architecture in California
Mission Revival architecture in California
Spanish Colonial Revival architecture in California
West Hills, Los Angeles